Ron Shushan (born 11 June 1993) is an Israeli footballer who currently plays as a Goalkeeper for Hapoel Ramat Gan. Ron is the brother of Mor Shushan.

Career
Shushan was brought up through the Maccabi Haifa youth system. During the 2012–13 season Shushan was the starting goalkeeper for Maccabi Haifa's youth team, winning with the team both the U-19 league and cup.

Shushan made his Israeli Premier League debut on 17 May 2014, against Hapoel Be'er Sheva in the club's final league match of the season. The game finished 1–1.

On 3 September 2014 Shushan was loaned to Hapoel Nazareth Illit, where he played for the remainder of the season, and won the local 'Best Newcomer' award.

Personal life

Ron shushan hosts the podcast "Fresh Talk" with Bar Timor.

Statistics

Honours
Liga Leumit
Winner (1): 2016-17

References
 Profile page in Maccabi Haifa website 
 

1993 births
Israeli Jews
Living people
Israeli footballers
Maccabi Haifa F.C. players
Hapoel Nof HaGalil F.C. players
Maccabi Netanya F.C. players
Hapoel Afula F.C. players
F.C. Ashdod players
Hapoel Rishon LeZion F.C. players
Hapoel Ramat Gan F.C. players
Footballers from Haifa
Israeli people of Moroccan-Jewish descent
Israeli Premier League players
Liga Leumit players
Association football goalkeepers